Tenacibaculum aestuarii is a Gram-negative and rod-shaped bacterium from the genus of Tenacibaculum which has been isolated from tidal flat sediments from Korea.

References

External links 
microbewiki Tenacibaculum aestuarii
Type strain of Tenacibaculum aestuarii at BacDive -  the Bacterial Diversity Metadatabase

Flavobacteria
Bacteria described in 2006